The first season of Asintado, a Philippine television drama series on ABS-CBN, premiered on January 15, 2018 on ABS-CBN's Kapamilya Gold afternoon block and worldwide on The Filipino Channel. Directed by Onat Diaz, Lino S. Cayetano, Jojo A. Saguin, Trina N. Dayrit, Jerome C. Pobocan, and Jon S. Villarin, the series stars Julia Montes as Ana Dimasalang, a paramedic who became Gael's nurse after saving him in an accident. She becomes entwined in an assassination plot arranged by the del Mundos and Ojedas upon witnessing their plan. The show features an ensemble cast consisting of Shaina Magdayao, Paulo Avelino, Aljur Abrenica, Lorna Tolentino, Agot Isidro, Nonie Buencamino, and Cherry Pie Picache.

Plot 
The fictional series begins in 1999 when two children, sisters Juliana (Julia Montes) and Katrina Ramirez (Shaina Magdayao), who are separated after a tragic fire that kills their parents. Before her father perishes, he entrusts a book to Katrina but does not tell her that it contains crucial evidence that explains his death. The siblings become orphans and Katrina blames Juliana for their parents' death. Following the tragedy, Juliana is adopted by the hardworking and loving Dimasalang family and changes her name to Ana Dimasalang, while Katrina is adopted by the wealthy and powerful Del Mundo family and changes her name to Samantha Del Mundo.

It is 2015 and Ana Dimasalang is an EMT while Samantha del Mundo is a successful jeweler. The two siblings meet again but are not aware that they are related. Ana is in love with Gael Ojeda (Paulo Avelino), a successful lawyer and budding politician, who is also Samantha's childhood best friend and ex-boyfriend. His mother is Miranda Ojeda (Lorna Tolentino), Senator Del Mundo's Political Strategist and Gael's godfather. The del Mundo and Ojeda family are very close and do not approve of Ana, not only because of the difference in their socio economic background but because they have plans for Samantha and Gael to reunite and build a political dynasty. Samantha is still in love with Gael and wants him back but Gael is deeply in love with Ana and is ready to give up everything just to be with Ana.

One day, Ana accidentally eavesdrops on the Senator and Miranda Ojeda discussing the need to silence Senator Reinoso, a political enemy. Confused at first, Ana becomes concerned when Senator Reinoso turns up dead. She tells Gael but he does not believe her so she reports it to the authorities, and the story turns into a media circus. The story is headlined all over the news by overzealous media, compromising Ana's security and her ability to tell Gael about Senator del Mundo's dictaphone containing the audio recording of Miranda and the Senator's conversation. Miranda orders their assassin to retrieve the missing dictaphone and kill Ana.

Coincidentally, Samantha overhears Miranda ordering someone to “get rid of Ana”. Curious and unsure of what she hears, she follows Ana home and is horrified when she witnesses Vicente and Ana Dimasalang's kidnapping and subsequent murders. Disturbed by what she sees, Samantha keeps her silence.

As it turns out, Samantha is not the only witness the crime. After Ana's news interview, some Reformists decide to follow Ana. Xander and Celeste arrive at the warehouse just as Ana and Vicente's bodies are stuffed in cement containers for disposal. While they are unable to save Vicente, they are able to retrieve Ana and she survives.

Gael tries to make sense of Ana's motives but she and her family disappears.  Devastated, he believes his mother's explanation that Ana is a spy paid by Reinoso to infiltrate his godfather's office to conduct a smear campaign against him. Heartbroken, Gael turns to his best friend Samantha for solace and they resume their relationship.

Six months after her disappearance, Ana wakes up from a coma in a house occupied by the children of Reformist Informers, all victims of Senator del Mundo. Ana learns their parents, including Ana's father, worked with the movement to expose the Senator's corruption. Her father perished while attempting to turnover a disk containing crucial evidence against Del Mundo to Celeste and the group. It is this disk that is in Samantha's possession, though she is not aware of it,

In the meantime, the Senator gets involved in a hostage negotiation that turns him into a hero.  Rowena Barrios, a celebrity journalist and long time staunch supporter of Salvador del Mundo is kidnapped and held hostage along with two Korean nationals by a terrorist group. When the Senator volunteers to negotiate for their release, Rowena discovers the hostage is staged and that the senator's negotiation is a public relations act to boost his image in exchange for arms and weapons sale to the terrorists. The Senator cold bloodedly shoots her, blaming her murder on the terrorists. Despite the young journalists death, the dramatic release of the Korean hostages boosts Senator del Mundo's popularity, His constituents clamor for his re-election.

Gael wants to redeem himself with the Senator who blames him for introducing Ana into their lives, so he accepts the Senator's offer to join him as the logistics operations front for the syndicate.  Samantha, on the other hand, refuses to lose sight on her husband, albeit newly married and pregnant, joins their core team. Totally unprepared for her father's approval, she revels in the joy of his attention. Nevertheless, the specter of Ana haunts Samantha, and reminders of her permeates into their relationship, she becomes obsessed and determined to eliminate Ana from their lives.

To exact her revenge, Ana enters Hillary Del Mundo's world under a different identity as Stella Guerrero, Xander's patrician wife who had died abroad, away from public knowledge a few years ago. Ana is a dead ringer for Stella, the sole heiress of the De la Torre Group, Asia's leading provider of hospitals and medical equipment. Using the Candelaria Mobile Medical Clinics, one of her family's subsidiaries, Ana partners with Hilary's mining company to provide mobile clinics to remote locations in San Isidro, a mining community persistently plagued with health issues. Their partnership  couldn’t have occurred at a better time, their mobile units demonstrate their worth with their quick response when a landslide occurred at the mines.  This allows her group close access to the mines where they suspect the logistics for the arms and weapons are executed.

As sole heiress of the De la Torre wealth, and with no other surviving relative or associates to say otherwise, Xander and Ana pull off the pretense, convincing the Del Mundos and de la Torre's remaining business partner that Ana is Stella. Except Gael who believes she is really Ana Dimasalang and he is determined to unmask her.

Their deception fails and despite the conflict that ensues as Ana's team comes close to bringing down Senator del Mundo, Ana and Gael rekindle their relationship causing a major shift in the dynamics within Ana's world and Gael's.  Later, Samantha and Gael divorce, their child dies, and the scandal surrounding Senator del Mundo surfaces, nearly bringing him behind bars.  Hillary discovers her husband's true evil nature and decides to leave him. She joins Ana's team. Samantha also leaves her father, he disowns her and everyone discovers she is Ana's lost sibling. Although conflicted at first, Samantha comes around and supports her sister and her relationship with her former husband.

Frustrated because Gael is determined to help Ana and remain by her side, Salvador and Miranda's nefarious hands are stayed, unable to proceed with their political ambitions.  We learn by this time Gael is Salvador's natural child.

The conflict comes to a head when Gael is killed in an ambush ordered by Salvador, but meant for the two sisters. Without Gael to protect her, Ana and Samantha are vulnerable against the might of the del Mundo resources and machinery.

Cast and characters

Protagonist  
 Julia Montes as Juliana "Ana" Dimasalang-Del Mundo / Juliana Ramirez and Stella Dela Torre-Guerrero

Main 

 Shaina Magdayao as Samantha "Sam" Del Mundo / Katrina Ramirez
 Paulo Avelino as Gael Ojeda / Gael Del Mundo
 Aljur Abrenica as Alexander "Xander" Guerrero

Starring
 Lorna Tolentino as Miranda Ojeda
 Cherry Pie Picache as Celeste "Ms. C." Ramos
 Agot Isidro as Hillary Gonzales-Del Mundo
 Nonie Buencamino as Salvador Del Mundo

Supporting 
 Empress Schuck as Dr. Monalisa "Mona" Calata
 Arron Villaflor as Ramoncito "Chito" Salazar
 Louise delos Reyes as Yvonne Calata
 Julio Diaz as Jaime Melchor "Tatay M" Gonzales / Manuel De Dios
 Karen Reyes as Emilita "Emmy" Gomez
 Ryle Paolo Tan as Jonathan "Tantan" Dimasalang
 Chokoleit as Gaspar "Gracia" Nuevadez
 Jean Saburit as Carlotta Candelaria
 Lemuel Pelayo as Diego Gabriel
 Ronnie Quizon as Jorge
 Jacqui Leus as Gigi
 Rolly Cruz as Mayor Ronquillo

Special Participation
 Gloria Sevilla as Purisima "Puring" Dimasalang

Guest 
 Christian Vasquez as Eric Salazar
 Art Acuña as Major Gregorio Calata
 Mari Kaimo as Senator Arturo Galvez
 Teroy Guzman as Senator Reynoso
 Bing Davao as Vice President Montemayor
 Nor Domingo as Berto
 Hannah Ledesma as Rowena Barrios
 Giovanni Baldisseri as DMO Employer

Special guest 
 Myel De Leon as young Juliana Ramirez / Juliana "Ana" Dimasalang
 Jana Agoncillo as young Katrina Ramirez / Samantha "Sam" Del Mundo
 Miguel Diokno as young Gael Ojeda / Gael O. Del Mundo
 Luis Alandy as Robert Ramirez
 Tanya Garcia as Criselda Ramirez
 Lito Pimentel as Vicente Dimasalang
 Mariella Laurel as young Miranda Ojeda
 Kazel Kinouchi as young Hillary Gonzales-Del Mundo
 Jess Mendoza as young Salvador Del Mundo

Episodes

References

External links 
 

Asintado
2018 Philippine television seasons